Acantholichen campestris is a species of basidiolichen in the family Hygrophoraceae. Found in Brazil, it was formally described as a new species in 2016 by Manuela Dal-Forno, Adriano Spielmann, and Robert Lücking. Here, at the top of the mountain on exposed rocky outcrops, it was found growing on rocks growing amongst liverworts and other lichens. The specific epithet, which contains the Latin word campis (meaning "plains" or "fields"), refers to the habitat of the lichen. Acantholichen campestris is the only member of the genus which, instead of growing on bark, overgrows lichens and liverworts that inhabit rock.

References

Hygrophoraceae
Lichen species
Lichens described in 2016
Lichens of South Brazil
Taxa named by Robert Lücking
Basidiolichens